The New Ireland yellow tiger (Parantica clinias) is a species of nymphalid butterfly in the subfamily Danainae. It is endemic to the island of New Ireland (Papua New Guinea).

References

Parantica
Lepidoptera of Papua New Guinea
Endemic fauna of Papua New Guinea
Butterflies described in 1890
Taxa named by Henley Grose-Smith
Taxonomy articles created by Polbot